Kendrick Mosley (born July 21, 1981 in Pahokee, Florida) is an American football wide receiver.

Playing career
He is on the injured reserve list with the Cleveland Gladiators in the Arena Football League. He started 16 of 46 games for Western Michigan University, catching 163 passes for 2,042 yards (12.5 avg.) and 12 touchdowns, adding  and 2 touchdowns on 67 punt returns (13.0 avg.).

Mosely was signed by the Atlanta Falcons as an undrafted free agent rookie in 2004. He played in a single NFL game in 2006 for the Cleveland Browns.

References

External links
Cleveland Gladiators' bio page

1981 births
Living people
People from Pahokee, Florida
American football wide receivers
Western Michigan Broncos football players
Cleveland Browns players
Cleveland Gladiators players